Richard Praty (or Pratty, c. 1390 – August 1445) was a medieval university Chancellor and Bishop.

After serving as the King's chaplain from 1430, including two years with him in France, Praty was made Dean of the Chapel Royal in 1432. He gave up this position after being nominated, with the active support of the King, to the office of the Bishop of Chichester on 21 April 1438 and consecrated on 27 July 1438. He was also Chancellor of the University of Oxford during 1438–9.

Praty died in August 1445.

Citations

References
 

1390 births
1445 deaths
Deans of the Chapel Royal
Chancellors of the University of Oxford
Bishops of Chichester
15th-century English Roman Catholic bishops